Feicheng Acid Chemicals is a chemical company based in Feicheng, Shandong, China.

The company was founded in 1994, with registered capital RMB 52.2 million. It is one of Chinese top 500 chemical industry enterprises and has established a "Postdoctoral Research Station" of national class and provincial "New Product Exploiting Center".

It is the largest producer of formic acid (100,000 metric tonnes per annum) outside Europe, owning over 10% of the world production capacity. (Formic acid is used as a preservative and antibacterial agent in livestock feed).

Products
The main products of Feicheng Acid Chemicals are:

References

External links

Chemical companies of China
Chinese companies established in 1994
Chemical companies established in 1994
Companies based in Shandong